The Replogle Gold Bug is an American single engine, cantilevered high wing aircraft with conventional landing gear that was designed by Merle Replogle for homebuilt construction.

Operational history
In 1991, the prototype was restored with the original VW engine.

Specifications (Gold Bug)

References

External links
Photo of a Gold Bug

Homebuilt aircraft